Lake Narracan is an artificial lake on the Latrobe River built to supply cooling water for the nearby brown coal-fired power stations.

Location
Lake Narracan is located on the Latrobe River in the Latrobe Valley. The dam wall is approximately 1.5 km upstream of the Yallourn Power Station. Its upper reaches are approximately 6 km further to the west, close to where the Narracan Creek meets the Latrobe River. The lake was formerly called the Yallourn Storage Dam.

History
The reservoir was first constructed by the State Electricity Commission of Victoria between 1959 and 1961 and has the capacity of 8,600 megalitres (ML).

In 2002 major works were undertaken to bring the reservoir up to modern day standards, including anchoring the dam wall to the foundation bedrock and strengthening the four gates.

Purpose
The dam supplies water for cooling the generators of the power stations in the Latrobe Valley. This supply is supplemented with water from Blue Rock Lake approximately 15 km upstream on the Tanjil River.

Recreational activities
Lake Narracan is the largest freshwater lake in Victoria that does not serve as a domestic water storage. It is used for recreational purposes, including waterskiing, jet skiing, swimming, recreational fishing, and bush walking on the shore. A school camp (Woorabinda), on the northern shore of the lake, offers facilities for around 75 people. On the southern shore there is a caravan park and campground. The Moe Golf Club is also located on the southern shore, with a number of holes overlooking Lake Narracan.

The Latrobe Valley Model Aero Club is also located on the lake shore. The Hovercraft Club of Victoria uses the west end of the lake. The Moe-Yallourn Rail Trail passes close by the southern shore of the lake and the Halls Bay Loop track was installed connecting the Rail Trail with South Shore Road.

References 

Lakes of Victoria (Australia)